The Cadillac Sixteen is a concept car first developed and presented by Cadillac in 2003.

The vehicle is equipped with a Cadillac proprietary-developed aluminum 32-valve V16 engine displacing 13.6 liters (829 cu. in; 13,584 cc), which was exclusive to the Sixteen and based on the GM Generation IV LS architecture. It is mated to a four-speed, electronically controlled, automatic transmission driving the rear wheels. The engine features fuel-saving Active Fuel Management "Displacement on Demand" technology, which could shut down either twelve or eight of the cylinders when the full output was not needed. The V16 was capable of 16.65 mpg under normal conditions.

The car referenced the Cadillac V-16 of the 1930s. The actual design of the car was a combination of Cadillac's current "Art and Science" design theme and 1967 Cadillac Eldorado cues. Additional original design elements were provided by an in-house design competition led by GM Vice President Bob Lutz.  The Sixteen has the Cadillac logo carved out of solid crystal on the steering wheel and a Bulgari clock on the dashboard.

Although the Sixteen remained a concept car, its design language was implemented in Cadillac's subsequent vehicles, most noticeably on the 2008 Cadillac CTS. Since its unveiling there have been resurfacing rumors about a possible very limited production of an exclusive Cadillac halo model. A scaled-down version of the car, referred to as the ULS (Ultra Luxury Sedan) or XLS, with a standard V8 and an optional V12 (the latter was to be called the Cadillac Twelve), had been rumored for production since 2005, but was eventually shelved in favor of the Cadillac XTS.

Ever since the Sixteen was first unveiled there have been resurfacing rumors, speculation and high hopes of automotive journalists and aficionados about a possible limited production of an exclusive Cadillac halo model, such as the Sixteen, to be the "ultimate flagship" of the brand and sit atop of the upcoming flagship, as previewed by the Ciel concept of late 2011. An exclusive Cadillac halo model descended from the Sixteen concept lineage was finally confirmed in March 2020 with the Cadillac Celestiq, an ultra luxury, 4 door electric flagship sedan set to begin production in 2023.

In media
It was on the episode of Ride with Funkmaster Flex at the 2003 New York International Auto Show.

Also in 2003, Top Gear reviewed the Cadillac 16 with its presenter James May in Series 2, Episode 10. May praised the Sixteen as "exactly what a Cadillac should be" and said it should be put into production.

In the 2006 comedy film Click starring Adam Sandler, Sandler's character is seen driving a Cadillac Sixteen when he visits his family in the year 2017.

In the 2011 film Real Steel, starring Hugh Jackman, the child's Aunt and Uncle are seen getting in and out of a Cadillac Sixteen at around 18 minutes in, as Jackman's character collects his money and his child.

It appears in the 2005 racing games Midnight Club 3: Dub Edition and Project Gotham Racing 3.

It appears in the 2013 racing game Asphalt 8: Airborne.

References

External links

 

Sixteen
Flagship vehicles
Full-size vehicles
Luxury vehicles
Sedans